Armed to the Teeth is the second studio album by the American rock band Abandoned Pools. It was released on September 27, 2005, though Universal Records.  The album is preceded by The Reverb EP, released June 7. The album draws on traditional progressive rock elements, combining them with diverse elements ranging from Mexican folk music to German polka.

The tracks "Tighter Noose" and "Waiting to Panic" originally appeared on The Reverb EP, but were then both re-recorded for this album.

Track listing

Personnel

Abandoned Pools
Tommy Walter – Lead vocals, rhythm guitar, bass guitar, keyboards, French horn on "Hunting (The Universe Breaks My Heart)"
Brian Head – Drums, percussion
Sean Woolstenhulme – Lead guitar, backing vocals

Management
Tonly Ciulla – Management
Justin Eshak, Tom MacKay – A&R

Artwork
T.J. River – Art direction, design
Minori Marukami, Zoren Gold – Photography

Production
Gareth Jones – Producer
Adam Moseley	 – Engineer
Danny Kalb – Assistant engineer
Steve Marcussen – Mastering
Ken Andrews – Mixing
Stewart Whitmore – Digital editing

Additional musicians
Emily Wright – Cello on tracks: 4, 8, 10–12 
Jian Wang – (tracks: 4, 11 to 12) – Tommy Walter (tracks: 6)
Billy Howerdel – Additional guitar on track: 10
Multitrack Murder, Scott Garret – Loops 
Alma Fernandez, Han Oh – Viola on tracks: 4, 11, 12
Arman Anassian, Erlinda Romero-Anassian, Nathan Lanier, & Victoria Lanier – Violin on tracks: 4, 11, 12

References

Tommy Walter albums
2005 albums
Universal Records albums